Events from 1848 in Switzerland.

Incumbents
Federal Council (starting from November 16th):
Ulrich Ochsenbein 
Jonas Furrer (President)
Josef Munzinger 
Henri Druey 
Friedrich Frey-Herosé
Wilhelm Matthias Naeff 
Stefano Franscini

Events
The position of President of the Swiss Confederation is created, with the inaugural president being Jonas Furrer

January

February
 Federal troops leave Zug
 Pro-republic uprising in La Chaux-de-Fonds, Le Locle, and Val-de-Travers

March
 1 March-Pro-republic forces overthrow the Council of State of the Canton of Neuchatel, declare the Canton a republic

April
Federal troops leave Wallis

May

June
27 June-Draft constitution accepted by the Swiss Diet

July
A Swiss constitutional referendum is held in July and August in the Cantons

August

September
12 September-New constitution declared accepted with 15 1/2 Cantons accepting, 6 1/2 voting against

October

November
6 November-Nationalrat and Ständerat meet in Bern for the first time
16 November-Seven members of Federal Council appointed. New constitution comes into force.

December

Births 

Pierre-Georges Jeanniot, a painter, designer, watercolorist, and engraver (d. 1934)
Adolfo Kind, a chemical engineer and one of the fathers of Italian skiing (d. August, 1907)
Andrew Mattei, a Swiss-Italian winemaker (d. 1931)
Auguste Baud-Bovy, a painter (d. 1949)
January 4-Heinrich Suter, a historian (d. March 17 1922)
April 21/23-Carl Rüedi, a pulmonologist (d. June 17, 1901)
June 30-Paul Zweifel, a gynecologist and physiologist (d. August 13, 1927)
September 1-Auguste Forel, a myrmecologist, neuroanatomist and psychiatrist (d. July 27, 1931)
October 24-William Foster Apthorp, a musician (d. February 19, 1913)
November 12-Eduard Müller, a politician (d. November 9, 1919)
November 28-Paul Charles Dubois, a neuropathologist (d. November 4, 1918)

Deaths 

June 27-Heinrich Zschokke, an author and reformer (b. March 22, 1771)

See also

List of Swiss people

References

External links
About the civil war

 
Years of the 19th century in Switzerland